Keenan Reynolds may refer to:

 Keenan Reynolds (American football), American football wide receiver
 Keenan Reynolds (Australian footballer), former Australian Rules football player